Krutov is a Russian male surname, its feminine counterpart is Krutova. Notable people with the surname include:

Alexander Krutov (born 1947), Russian journalist and politician
Alexei Krutov (born 1984), Russian ice hockey winger
Igor Krutov (born 1995), Russian football midfielder
Sergei Krutov (born 1969), Russian football player
Vladimir Krutov (1960–2012), nicknamed "The Tank", Russian ice hockey player
Ninel Krutova (born 1926), Russian diver

Russian-language surnames